Katy Murphy (born 8 December 1962) is a Scottish actress and teacher who has appeared in many television programs, most of them for the BBC and ITV. While most associated with television drama, she has worked across a variety of genres, including crime and children.

Early life
"Growing up in Glasgow’s east end housing scheme Cranhill, teaching was the plan," and Murphy studied at Glasgow University before discovering a love for the stage. Her birth name is Margaret.

Career
Murphy rose to prominence after appearing in Tutti Frutti (1987), starring Robbie Coltrane. It was written by John Byrne for BBC Scotland, and won six BAFTAs, bringing "many of the cast to national prominence." She also appeared in Byrne's next series, Your Cheatin' Heart (1990), starring Tilda Swinton.

Other credits include Takin' Over the Asylum, written by Donna Franceschild, A Mug's Game (1996), Mike and Angelo, Spatz, B&B, The Steamie, The River, Casualty, and Agatha Christie's Poirot. She played the part of Jenny Wren in the BBC Two adaptation of Charles Dickens' Our Mutual Friend.

Among her later work is the distraught mother of a murdered girl in Prime Suspect (2006), and the 2008 drama series Honest. In 2018, Murphy again teamed up with Donna Franceschild to star in her short film Bridge, with Steven Duffy. Her radio work includes the role of Janet in the Radio 4 series Adventures of a Black Bag.

Katy Murphy works part time as a teacher, with young children, including those with special needs, saying she loves it because "[it’s] so healthy. You’re looking outwards, rather than inwards." When teaching, she uses the name Margaret, which is on her birth certificate.

Personal life

Murphy lives in North London's Crouch End, where she has owned a home since 1998, the year her daughter, Lola, was born.

References

External links

Living people
Schoolteachers from Glasgow
Scottish television actresses
1963 births
Actresses from Glasgow
People from Crouch End